Denisovka is the name of several rural localities in Russia.

Modern localities
Denisovka, Dyatkovsky District, Bryansk Oblast, a village in Slobodishchensky Selsoviet of Dyatkovsky District of Bryansk Oblast
Denisovka, Suzemsky District, Bryansk Oblast, a selo in Denisovsky Selsoviet of Suzemsky District of Bryansk Oblast
Denisovka, Kemerovo Oblast, a village in Padunskaya Rural Territory of Promyshlennovsky District of Kemerovo Oblast
Denisovka, Komi Republic, a village in Mutny Materik Selo Administrative Territory of the town of republic significance of Usinsk in the Komi Republic
Denisovka, Krasnoyarsk Krai, a village in Ustyansky Selsoviet of Abansky District of Krasnoyarsk Krai
Denisovka, Medvensky District, Kursk Oblast, a village in Kitayevsky Selsoviet of Medvensky District of Kursk Oblast
Denisovka, Shchigrovsky District, Kursk Oblast, a village in Troitskokrasnyansky Selsoviet of Shchigrovsky District of Kursk Oblast
Denisovka, Lipetsk Oblast, a selo in Urusovsky Selsoviet of Chaplyginsky District of Lipetsk Oblast
Denisovka, Mari El Republic, a village in Maryinsky Rural Okrug of Yurinsky District of the Mari El Republic
Denisovka, Omsk Oblast, a village in Sedelnikovsky Rural Okrug of Sedelnikovsky District of Omsk Oblast
Denisovka, Kolpnyansky District, Oryol Oblast, a village in Akhtyrsky Selsoviet of Kolpnyansky District of Oryol Oblast
Denisovka, Pokrovsky District, Oryol Oblast, a village in Verkhnezhernovsky Selsoviet of Pokrovsky District of Oryol Oblast
Denisovka, Perm Krai, a village in Vereshchaginsky District of Perm Krai
Denisovka, Pskov Oblast, a village in Kunyinsky District of Pskov Oblast
Denisovka, Rostov Oblast, a khutor in Ryazhenskoye Rural Settlement of Matveyevo-Kurgansky District of Rostov Oblast
Denisovka, Monastyrshchinsky District, Smolensk Oblast, a village in Novomikhaylovskoye Rural Settlement of Monastyrshchinsky District of Smolensk Oblast
Denisovka, Roslavlsky District, Smolensk Oblast, a village in Syrokorenskoye Rural Settlement of Roslavlsky District of Smolensk Oblast
Denisovka, Vladimir Oblast, a village in Kovrovsky District of Vladimir Oblast
Denisovka, Voronezh Oblast, a settlement in Mosolovskoye Rural Settlement of Anninsky District of Voronezh Oblast

Renamed localities
Denisovka, former name of Lomonosovo, a selo in Kholmogorsky District of Arkhangelsk Oblast

ru:Денисовка#Россия